The 2017–18 Latvian Hockey League season was the 27th season of the Latvian Hockey League, the top level of ice hockey in Latvia. Six teams participated in the league, and HK Kurbads won the championship.

Regular season

Playoffs

References

External links
 Latvian Ice Hockey Federation

Latvian Hockey League
Latvian Hockey League seasons
Latvian